in Fukuoka Prefecture, Japan, is a Japanese singer-songwriter and actress. She is managed by the agency Amuse Inc. and signed to SPEEDSTAR RECORDS.

Biography 
Sakura Fujiwara was born on December 30, 1995, and grew up in Fukuoka prefecture, Japan. Sakura's father was a bass player in a rock band in his youth. When she was 10 years old, she got a classical guitar from her father and began playing music.

Her father had a great love for music and Sakura began listening to various music genres such as rock, folk, soul and world music. Under the influence of her father, she became an enthusiastic fan of The Beatles. Sakura professes that her favorite musician is Paul McCartney. She also enjoys Yael Naim, Nora Jones, and YUI out of all female musicians.

2015

Sakura made her debut in 2015 with the mini-album à la carte. "Just one girl" was used for the drama Gakkō no Kaidan as the featured song.

2016

Her first studio album good morning was released in 2016. She starred in the romantic television drama, Love Song, alongside Masaharu Fukuyama. It aired from April 11 to June 13, 2016, on Fuji TV. She released her first single Soup on June 8, 2016.

2017

On March 29, 2017, Sakura released her second single Someday / Haru no Uta. "Haru no uta" was used for the theme song of live-action adaptation of March Comes in like a Lion. Her second studio album PLAY was released on May 10, 2017. The song "1995", which is included in the album good morning, was used for the film Sekai wa Kyou kara Kimi no Mono (English title_ Her Sketchbook). On September 27, 2017, Sakura released the collaboration song "Koi no Hajimari" with Leo Ieiri and Sakurako Ohara. On October 25, 2017, Sakura collaborated with manga artist Eisaku Kubonouchi and composed the song "Just the way we are" for NHK Paralympic-Themed Anime short movie.

2018

On February 7, 2018, Sakura released the song "The Moon". This song was used as the theme song of the animation movie Code Geass: Lelouch of the Rebellion II Handou. On May 23, 2018, Sakura made a cover of Sheena Ringo's song "Akane sasu kiro terasaredo .." in Ringo's 20th anniversary tribute album Adam to Eve no Ringo (Adam and Eve's Apple). On June 13, 2018, Sakura released her second mini-album green. The song "NEW DAY" was used for the ED of the anime television series Waka Okami wa Shōgakusei! (English title_ OKKO'S INN) and the song "Mata Ashita (English title_ See you Tomorrow)" was used for the theme song of the animation movie Waka Okami wa Shōgakusei!. On September 19, 2018, Sakura released her third mini-album red. The EP green and red is a two-part work.

2020

On October 21, her third studio album SUPERMARKET was released.

2021

On August 25, her first live album SUPERMARKET Live 2021 at Nakano Sunplaza was released.

Discography

Studio albums 
 2016: good morning
 2017: PLAY
 2020: SUPERMARKET

Mini-albums 
 2015: à la carte
 2018: green, red

Live-albums 
 2021: SUPERMARKET Live 2021 at Nakano Sunplaza

Singles 
 2016: Soup
 2017: Someday / Haru no Uta

Collaborations 
 2016: Hello radio (Pool Side)
 2017: Koi no Hajimari (with Leo Ieiri and Sakurako Ohara)
 2021: DRIVEAWAY feat. Sakura Fujiwara (Michael Kaneko)
 2021: Smile! with  Sakura Fujiwara (Rei)

Filmography

TV dramas 
 Love Song, as Sakura Sano (Fuji TV, 2016)
 The Public Enemy episode 6, as Senior high school student (Fuji TV, 2017)
 Dive!!, as Kyoko (TV Tokyo, 2021)
 Fight Song, as Rin Hagiwara (TBS, 2022)

Film 
 Ginpei-cho Cinema Blues (2023)

References

External links 
 Official website（Japanese）
 Sakura Fujiwara's channel on YouTube

Living people
1995 births
21st-century Japanese actresses
Japanese women singer-songwriters
Musicians from Fukuoka Prefecture
People from Fukuoka
Japanese radio personalities
Japanese women pop singers
Amuse Inc. talents
21st-century Japanese women singers